Eilema costalba is a moth of the subfamily Arctiinae, first described by Alfred Ernest Wileman and Richard South in 1919. It is found on Luzon in the Philippines.

References

Moths described in 1919
costalba